Sacred wood or Sacred Woods may refer to:

 Sacred grove, a mythological landscape, referenced in many traditions or religions
 The Sacred Wood, a collection of essays by T.S. Eliot
 Sacred Woods, a 1939 French comedy film
 "Sacred Woods", a song by Varien featuring Skyelle

See also
Sacred grove (disambiguation)